Helianthus microcephalus is a perennial species of Helianthus also known as small woodland sunflower or small-wood sunflower or small-head sunflower or simply as woodland sunflower. It is a native of Northern America, and is to be found growing in open woodlands and along roadsides. It is a host plant for the American painted lady, painted lady, and spring azure butterflies. It is also a larval host plant for the silvery checkerspot butterfly.

References

External links

Flora of Michigan
microcephalus
Flora of North America
Flora without expected TNC conservation status